Mildred is an unincorporated community in Cherry Township, Sullivan County, Pennsylvania, United States. It was home to Turnpike Elementary School, one of two elementary schools in the Sullivan County School District prior to consolidation with Sullivan County Elementary School in 2011.

As of the 2010 census the population of ZIP code 18632 was 430 people.

References

Unincorporated communities in Pennsylvania
Unincorporated communities in Sullivan County, Pennsylvania